Rumburak hilaris is a jumping spider species in the genus Rumburak that lives in South Africa.

References

Endemic fauna of South Africa
Salticidae
Spiders of South Africa
Spiders described in 2014